The world's safest banks is an annual ranking (top 50) made by the Global Finance magazine.

The top ten banks listed in the 2018 ranking were:

Other years' rankings can be viewed on the magazine's website.

See also
 Commonwealth banknote-issuing institutions
 European Central Bank
 List of banks
 List of banks in Africa
 List of banks in the Americas
 List of banks in Europe
 List of central banks
 List of largest banks in North America
 List of largest banks in Latin America

References

Lists of banks